

Great Britain
Province of New Jersey – William Franklin, Governor (1763–1776)

Portugal
 Angola – Francisco Inocéncio de Sousa Coutinho, Governor (1764–1772)
 Macau – Jose Placido de Matos Saraiva, Governor of Macau (1764–1767)

Colonial governors
Colonial governors
1766